Emery Andrew Rovenstine (July 20, 1895 – November 9, 1960) was an American anesthesiologist best known for organizing the first academic Department of Anesthesiology at New York's Bellevue Hospital. He also helped develop the anesthetic use for the gas cyclopropane, and he was a pioneer in therapeutic nerve blocking.  Upon his death in 1960, the New York Times proclaimed him "one of the world's foremost anesthesiologists."

Early life 

Dr. Rovenstine was born in 1895, in Atwood, Indiana, where he clerked at his father's grocery store. He briefly attended Winona College in nearby Winona Lake and taught high school before moving on to Wabash College, where he was graduated in 1917. Upon graduation, Rovenstine enlisted in the Army and served in France during World War I. During his three years of active duty, much of which he spent in charge of an engineering demolition squad, he witnessed battlefield pain and suffering which inspired him to pursue a career in medicine.

Medical career 

After returning home for several years of teaching and coaching, he decided to attend medical school at Indiana University, from which he received a degree in medicine in 1928. In 1930, after struggling to maintain a general practice during economically difficult times, he took a faculty post at the University of Wisconsin–Madison, where he studied under Dr. Ralph M. Waters and served as assistant professor of anesthesia.  He and Waters experimented on the gas cyclopropane and were the first doctors to use it on human subjects.

In 1935, Rovenstine was appointed chair of the department of anesthesiology at Bellevue Hospital, where he was influential in shaping the department's mission and mentoring future generations of anesthesiologists. During this time he developed a nerve blocking technique and became the first anesthesiologist to set up a nerve blocking clinic for pain relief. Two years later, he was appointed the second American professor of anesthesiology at New York University School of Medicine.

He became director at Goldwater Memorial Hospital in 1938 and Director at University Hospital a decade later. Also in 1938, he accepted a guest professorship at Oxford University in England, and, a year later, at University of Rosario in Argentina. He also accepted visiting appointments in Bohemia, Canada, Cuba, Czechoslovakia, France, Japan, Mexico and South Africa – and was inducted into the medical society of each respective nation.

During World War II, Rovenstine served on the Army Advisory Board and was responsible for an order to Army general hospitals placing operating rooms in charge of anesthesiologists. The practice later became general.

Rovenstine was a co-founder of the reorganized American Society of Anesthesiologists and served as its president from 1943 to 1944. In 1957, he received that Society's Distinguished Service Award. He was also the founder of the PostGraduate Assembly (PGA) in Anesthesiology and the American Board of Anesthesiology.

He was honored by numerous organizations and governments, notably being decorated at the Verdun by the French government (for his service in the war), and being decorated by the Order of the White Lion in Czechoslovakia (for a humanitarian teaching mission there).

Residents 
Among Rovenstine's notable residents at Bellevue were Stuart Cullen, Emanuel Papper, Virginia Apgar, Perry Volpitto, John Adriani, Louis Orkin, Sam Denson, Richard Ament, Gertie Marx, Martin Helrich, Sara Joffe, and Lewis Wright.

Rovenstine Lectureship 

The Emery A. Rovenstine Memorial Lecture series began in 1962, shortly following Dr. Rovenstine's death. The lecture is delivered by a prominent anesthesiologist each year at the annual American Society of Anesthesiologists meeting, and has become the meeting's premier event.

Athletics 

Athletics played a significant role in Rovenstine's life. His first encounter with an anesthesiologist was during a high school basketball game, when he head-butted Arthur Ernest Guedel, a prominent scholar who happened to be officiating. Guedel threw the boy over his knee and gave him a spanking. He later studied under Guedel at Indiana University, and it was Guedel who helped Rovenstine secure the post at the University of Wisconsin.

At Wabash College, Rovenstine played baseball, basketball, football, and was sports editor of the school's newspaper. He also played semi-profession baseball on the side under the name "Jack Andrews."

Rovenstine coached basketball himself at LaPorte High School in LaPorte, Indiana from 1920 to 1924, where he still has the best winning percentage in the school's history.

Notes

External links
 Knox, Gordon. Anesthesia for Operative Procedures of Short Duration, for Induction Prior to Ether and to Complement Nitrous Oxide-Oxygen. Princeton, New Jersey. UNT Digital Library. https://digital.library.unt.edu/ark:/67531/metadc13623/.
 "Meet Emery Rovenstine" https://www.youtube.com/watch?v=dnTbH9h78y4

American medical researchers
American anesthesiologists
1895 births
1960 deaths
Wabash College alumni